was a Japanese TV and film screenwriter. He was born in Ishikawa Prefecture of Japan. He graduated from Meiji University.

Script

TV programs
some episodes of Ultraman
some episodes of Ultra Seven
some episodes of Monkey

Films
Death by Hanging (1968, co-writing)

Associates
Akio Jissoji
Nagisa Oshima
Masao Adachi
Ishidō Toshirō
Tamura Takeshi
Matsuda Masao
Toshio Matsumoto
Fusako Shigenobu

References

1936 births
2006 deaths
Meiji University alumni
People from Ishikawa Prefecture
20th-century Japanese screenwriters